Anitra Ford (born 1942) is an American former actress and  former model. She is best known for her work as a model from 1972 to 1976 on the CBS daytime and syndicated nighttime game show The Price Is Right starring Bob Barker (CBS) and Dennis James (syndication).

Ford's mother acted in summer stock theater productions, and her father was a jazz musician. After she graduated from high school, she became a model.

Ford's first modeling assignment was a swimsuit spread for Life magazine that featured her on the cover. Her film appearances included The Big Bird Cage (1972), Invasion of the Bee Girls (1973), Messiah of Evil (1973), Stacey (1973) and The Longest Yard (1974),  and she appeared in episodes of the television programs Banacek, S.W.A.T., Mannix and Starsky and Hutch.

She also appeared on a 2018 episode of the TV game show To Tell The Truth in which she played the contestant who was indeed telling the truth about being a former model on The Price Is Right.

Filmography
The Love Machine (1971) - Model (uncredited)
Where Does It Hurt? (1972) - Reception Desk Nurse
The Big Bird Cage (1972) - Terry
Invasion of the Bee Girls (1973) - Dr. Susan Harris
Messiah of Evil (1973) - Laura
Stacey (1973) - Tish Chambers
Wonder Woman (1974) - Ahnjayla 
Dirty O'Neil (1974) - Kyote Passenger
The Longest Yard (1974) - Melissa

See also
 The Price Is Right models

References

External links 

Anitra Ford's Personal Blog

1942 births
20th-century American actresses
American film actresses
Place of birth missing (living people)
Game show models
Living people
21st-century American women
Mira Costa High School alumni